The Onchocercidae  are a family of nematodes in the superfamily Filarioidea.  This family includes some of the most devastating human parasitic diseases, such as lymphatic filariasis, onchocerciasis, loiasis, and other filariases.

Representative genera and species
The taxonomy of nematodes in the order Spirurida is still in a state of flux, and the family Onchocercidae contains around 70–80 genera.<ref>Anderson, R.C. (2000) "Family Onchocercidae." In: Nematode Parasites of Vertebrates: Their Development and Transmission. 2nd Edition. CABI Publishing: Wallingford, England. . pp. 472-532.</ref> The following genera are included in the family Onchocercidae in the Wikispecies project and the Entrez Taxonomy Browser.  The latter is the taxonomic system used in the NCBI family of databases, including PubMed.AcanthocheilonemaAcanthocheilonema viteae (parasite of gerbils in Eastern Europe, Iran, and North Africa)Acanthocheilonema reconditum (parasite of dogs)BrugiaBrugia malayi (one cause of filariasis in humans)Brugia pahangi (parasite of domestic cats and wild animals)Brugia timori (cause of "timor filariasis" in humans)BreinliaCercopithifilariaCercopithifilaria johnstoni (parasite of rodents and marsupials in Australia)ChandlerellaChandlerella quiscali (parasite of birds in North America)DipetalonemaDipetalonema reconditum (parasite of dogs, and sometimes humans)Dipetalonema repens (parasite of dogs, and sometimes humans)DirofilariaDirofilaria immitis (heartworm in dogs and cats, occasionally humans)Dirofilaria repens (parasite of dogs, and sometimes humans)Dirofilaria tenuis (parasite of raccoons, and rarely humans)Dirofilaria ursi (parasite of bears, and sometimes humans)ElaeophoraElaeophora abramovi (parasite of moose in Russia)Elaeophora bohmi (parasite of horses in Austria and Iran)Elaeophora elaphi (parasite of Red Deer in Spain)Elaeophora poeli (parasite of various cattle in Africa and Asia)Elaeophora sagitta (parasite of several mammal groups in Africa)Elaeophora schneideri (parasite of various ruminants in North America)FoleyellaFoleyella furcata (parasite of lizards)LitomosaLitomosa westi (parasite of bats)LitomosoidesLitomosoides brasiliensis (parasite of bats)Litomosoides scotti (parasite of the marsh rice rat)Litomosoides sigmodontis (parasite of rodents)Litomosoides wilsoni (parasite of opossums)Loa (see also Loa loa filariasis)Loa loaMansonella (see also mansonelliasis)Mansonella ozzardi (parasite of man in Central and South America)Mansonella perstans (parasite of humans and primates in Africa and South America)Mansonella streptocerca (parasite of humans in Africa)OchoterenellaOchoterenella digiticauda (parasite of amphibians)OnchocercaOnchocerca gibsoni (parasite of cattle in Asia and Australia)Onchocerca gutturosa (parasite of cattle in Africa, Europe, and North America)Onchocerca volvulus (parasite of humans in Africa, six countries in Latin America, and Yemen), cause of river blindness)Onchocerca lupi (parasite of canines in the United States, Greece, Portugal, Germany, Hungary, Switzerland, and Canada), cause of Canine Ocular Onchocerciasis)PiratubaPiratuba digiticauda (parasite of amphibians)SarconemaSarconema eurycerca (cause of heartworm in swans)WaltonellaWaltonella flexicauda (parasite of bullfrogs)WuchereriaWuchereria bancrofti (parasite of humans, cause of "bancroftian filariasis")Wuchereria kalimantani'' (parasite of monkeys in Indonesia)

See also 
List of parasites of humans

References

External links 

Spirurida
Parasitic nematodes of mammals
Nematode families
Taxa named by Alain Chabaud